The Landmark Tower Company was based out of Fort Worth, Texas and founded by Henry “Hank” McGinnis. The company was known for designing and building a type of radio tower known by the same name. McGinnis, who  had previous experience building electric transmission line towers, evidently came up with the unique design while scribbling a Christian symbol of a fish on a napkin.

Tower design
The prototypical Landmark tower, also known as an Adelphon tower, is a tripod in shape with three legs that rise to meet each other about a third of the way up. The legs taper down from larger footings to a thinner middle and then expand again to the point where they meet. The outer cords continue all the way up to the top of the tower in one swoop, but the inner three loop around into each other, creating a central ovoid and voided core. Aside from its unique appearance, the Landmark tower design has several advantages compared to the typical free standing lattice tower, with less wind resistance and a reduced amount of steel required for construction.

List of towers 

The most well known example is the Star Tower, located in Cincinnati, Ohio. The individual base leg columns were erected by crane, while the upper sections of the tower were built using a Sikorsky S-64 helicopter. Numerous other Landmark towers can found across the United States, including the Mesquite Tower in Mesquite, Texas, the Hughes Memorial Tower in Washington, D.C., and, at a smaller scale, WPXR-TV's analog antenna on Poor Mountain in Virginia, and another atop the Energy Plaza skyscraper in downtown Dallas, used by TXU Energy for its communications needs. None are known to have been built outside of the United States. The Adelphon Tower Company (Henry McGinnis) wrote bankruptcy on Prime Contractor Pyramid Tower & others in 1991 as Star 64 was completed. Many others were listed in the Chapter 7.  The Landmark Tower Company went bankrupt as Henry's wife attempted to continue after Henry McGinnis passed on in 2002.

See also 
 Lattice tower
 List of tallest freestanding steel structures

References

Bankrupt companies of the United States
Defunct companies based in Texas
Companies based in Fort Worth, Texas